The Pilgrim's Route, (Pilegrimsleden) also known as St. Olav's Way or the Old Kings' Road, was a pilgrimage route to the Nidaros Cathedral in Trondheim, Norway, the  site of the medieval tomb of St. Olav. It starts in the ancient part of Oslo and heads north along the lake Mjøsa, up the Gudbrandsdal valley, over the Dovrefjell mountains, and down the Oppdal and Gauldalen valleys to end at the Nidaros Cathedral.

Route
Although the Pilgrim's Route over the Dovrefjell mountains is only one of several pilgrimage routes in Norway, it is arguably the most famous. It connected the historically important Norwegian cities of Oslo and Nidaros (now Trondheim).

Oldest Known Route
The oldest known route over the Dovrefjell mountains, leaving the valley of the Lågen at the  Kongsgården (King’s Farm) ar Tofte just past Dovre Church in the municipality of Dovre (slightly south of present-day Dombås).  It followed a lower and more easterly route which followed the drainage to the east of Tofte, and then proceeded over Dovrefjell to join the route in Oppdal municipality.

King's Way
The "King's Way" traveled up through the Gudbrandsdal valley and left the valley of the Lågen at Tofte Kongsgården (King’s Farm) shortly past the Dovre Church in the municipality of Dovre (just south of present-day Dombås). This route went more directly over the Dovrefjell mountains into the municipality of Oppdal.

Shelters
The historically heavy stream of pilgrims which visited the shrine of St. Olaf in Trondheim annually prior to the Reformation resulted in the erection of mountain stations where the pilgrims could find food and shelter. Stations were erected at Kongsvoll, Drivstuen, Fogstuen, and later at Hjerkinn.

In speaking of the route, Knut Gjerset quotes Peder Claussøn Friis as writing in the late 16th century, "But in the winter people of high estate, as well as members of the court, travel mostly this way, because however high and deep the snow may fall, it blows together on the high mountains and becomes so hard men and horses can walk on it. The bonder [farmers] run over it on skis and snow-shoes. There are three stations: Drivstuen, Herdekinn and Fogstuen built on this same mountain in order that travelers may find lodging there...at the stations there are implements and dry wood, so that the traveler may build themselves  fire, and not suffer from cold, when they have to remain over night, and cannot find the way across the mountain."

History
There is clear evidence that this route had seen heavy use in the early Norwegian Iron Age.  Oppdal on the route was located at a crossroads for traffic from Trondheim,  traffic over the Dovrefjell mountain range  and the east coast. At Oppdal there are over 700 Viking era grave mounds  indicating that Viking trade routes passed through these valleys.

It is appropriately termed "The King's Road". Virtually every king of Norway traveled this road. Those for whom we easily find records of their passage range from the first King of Norway through the last King able to pass that way before the road was completely replaced with modern rail and tarmac.

Harald Fairhair or Harold I was the first king of all Norway who crossed the Dovrefjell on The King's Road.  Harald Hårfagres saga describes an expedition he led up the Gudbrandsdal, and north over Dovrefjeld on his way to success at the battle of Orkadal.

Kings
The Saga of St. Olaf says that in the year 1021 and again in 1024 King Olaf (1015–1028) travelled north through the Gudbrandsdal valley to Dovrefjell, where he crossed to Nidaros and remained there all winter.
Magnus Berrføtts saga describes King Haakon Magnusson’s death in the Dovrefjell mountains in 1094.  While crossing them he chased a rock ptarmigan until he got sick and died, leaving Magnus King of Norway.
Christian V (King of Denmark & Norway from 1670 to 1699) crossed the Dovrefjell mountains on horseback in 1685.
Frederik IV  (King of Denmark & Norway from 1699 to 1730) crossed the Dovrefjell mountains in 1704 by cariole. The Norwegian cariole at that time only held one passenger, and the driver or attendant stood or sat behind on a narrow board above the axle.
Christian VI (King of Denmark & Norway from 1730 to 1746) crossed the Dovrefjell mountains in a 4-horse carriage in 1733.  An illustrated manuscript of King Christian and Queen Sophie Magdalene's five-month-long journey through Norway is preserved in the Amalienborg Palace in Copenhagen, of which a facsimile edition was published in 1992.
King Frederik V’s initials remained carved at Tofte from his passage through.
Christian Frederick passed this way, as did Karl Johan.

Railway lines
The Norwegian railway line Rørosbanen was opened on 13 October 1877, connecting Hamar and Trondheim via the towns of Elverum and Røros. At this point, the difficult route up through the Dovrefjell mountains lost most of its appeal, compared with the relative ease of taking a train to Trondheim. The final end came on 17 September 1921, when the Dovre Line was completed. Starting at Dombås in Dovre municipality, it passes over the mountainous stretches of the Dovrefjell, before merging with the Rørosbanen again at Støren. It passes close to the Old King's Road's historic route, but is to the west along a route which, although longer, has a lesser grade, as is required for rail.

Present-day route
Although the Pilgrim's Route fell into disuse with the arrival of the railroad, but has recently been revived. Today it is promoted and is used by modern travelers  as a long-distance hiking trail.  There is a Pilgrim's Office in Oslo which gives advice to travelers and a Pilgrim Centre in Trondheim, under the aegis of the Nidaros Cathedral, which awards certificates to successful travelers upon the completion of their journey.

See also 
St. Olavsleden

References

Other sources
Raju, Alison (2015) The Pilgrim Road to Trondheim: Oslo to Nidaros Cathedral (Trondheim: Museumsforlaget) 
Luthen, Eivind  (1992) I pilegrimenes fotspor til Nidaros (Oslo: Cappelen)  
Kollandsrud,  Mari (1997) Pilgrimsleden til Nidaros (Oslo: Gyldendal) 
Hansen, Knut Ingar  (1997) Pilegrimsgang til Nidaros (Oslo: Gyldendal Tiden) 
Söderlund, Staffan;  Marie Sjöström (2016) St Olavsleden: pilgrimsfärd från hav till hav, en guide (Växjö: Vildmarksbiblioteket)

External links
Pilegrimsleden -- official website
The Pilgrim Sly Treks Norway Diary from a trek in 2009
Olav's way hints and tips from Kate and Corwen at Ancient Music UK, with travelogue page 1 page 2 page 3 page 4 page 5

Pilgrimage routes
Christian pilgrimages
Old roads of Norway
History of Trondheim
Hiking trails in Norway